Pamela Ann Crain (born 17 July 1939) is an English former cricketer who played as a right-handed batter and right-arm medium bowler. She appeared in 4 One Day Internationals for International XI at the 1973 World Cup. She was also part of the England side that toured South Africa in 1960–61. She played domestic cricket for East Anglia.

References

External links
 
 

1939 births
Living people
Cricketers from St Albans
East Anglia women cricketers
English women cricketers
International XI women One Day International cricketers